This is a list of species named endangered by the Missouri Department of Conservation, which are not necessarily on the U.S. Endangered Species List. It is not comprehensive.

Invertebrates
Nicrophorus americanus, American burying beetle
Fusconaia ebena, ebonyshell mussel
Elliptio crassidens, elephant ear mussel
Lampsilis abrupta, pink mucket mussel
Leptodea leptodon, scaleshell mussel
Plethobasus cyphyus, sheepnose, or bullhead mussel
Epioblasma triquetra, snuffbox mussel

Vertebrates

Birds
Aimophila aestivalis, Bachmann's sparrow
Tympanuchus cupido, greater prairie chicken
Sternula antillarum, least tern
Falco peregrinus, peregrine falcon, currently being reintroduced to the state in urban areas.

Reptiles
Emydoidea blandingii, Blanding's turtle
Sistrurus tergeminus tergeminus, the prairie massasauga rattlesnake, a subspecies of the western massasauga, which is a genus of venomous rattlesnakes.
Deirochelys reticularia miaria, western chicken turtle
Kinosternon flavescens flavescens, yellow mud turtle
Nerodia cyclopion, Mississippi green watersnake

Amphibians
Cryptobranchus alleganiensis, hellbender

Fish

Umbra limi, central mudminnow
Crystallaria asprella, crystal darter
Hybognathus hayi, cypress minnow
Platygobio gracilis, flathead chub
Etheostoma parvipinne, goldstripe darter
Cottus specus, grotto sculpin, a rare fish found only in Perry County, which is federally listed as endangered. It is of the order Scorpaeniformes.
Etheostoma histrio, harlequin darter
Acipenser fulvescens, lake sturgeon
Percina nasuta, longnose darter
Noturus eleutherus, mountain madtom
Noturus placidus, Neosho madtom
Etheostoma nianguae, Niangua darter
Amblyopsis rosae, Ozark cavefish
Scaphirhynchus albus, pallid sturgeon
Etheostoma whipplei, redfin darter
Notropis sabinae, sabine shiner, an eastern shiner
Forbesichthys agassizi, spring cavefish, the only Missouri cavefish with eyes.
Etheostoma fusiforme, swamp darter
Notropis maculatus, taillight shiner, an eastern shiner
Notropis topeka, Topeka shiner, an eastern shiner

Mammals
Spilogale putorius, eastern spotted skunk
Myotis grisescens, gray bat
Myotis sodalis, Indiana bat
Canis lupus, gray wolf (or timber wolf)

Plants

Boltonia decurrens, decurrent false aster
Geocarpon minimum, known as tinytim, earth fruit, or simply geocarpon
Asclepias meadii, Mead's milkweed
Physaria filiformis, Missouri bladderpod
Lindera melissifolia, pondberry
Trifolium stoloniferum, running buffalo clover
Platanthera praeclara, western prairie fringed orchid

References

Lists of endangered species